John Watson (1520–1584) was Bishop of Winchester in the 1580s.

Life
He was born in Evesham, Worcestershire, England, the son of Thomas Watson and Agnes née Weeks. Thomas Watson was born in Evesham around 1491 and in 1544 purchased part of the former Evesham Abbey lands and the lordship of Bengeworth, across the River Avon from Evesham town. On those lands he built a fine Tudor house as the family home. It was named the Mansion House, and though much modified, retained that name until about 1970, when it was renamed the Evesham Hotel, which name it still bears in 2020.

He qualified with a Bachelor of Arts from Oxford University in June 1539. In 1540 he was elected Fellow of All Souls College, Oxford. On 25 June 1544 he qualified with the Master of Arts. He graduated as  Doctor of Medicine at Oxford 27 July 1573. Between 1572 and 1580 he was Master of the Hospital of St. Cross and Dean of Winchester.

He became a prebendary of Winchester Cathedral on 14 December 1551 and 26 August 1559.
On 7 February 1557/58 he was Collated to the Chancellorship of St Paul's Cathedral, London. In 1559 he was appointed Archdeacon of Surrey. In 1580 he lived in Wolvesey Castle Winchester.

He was admitted as Dean of Winton on 14 February 1572/3 after Dr Frank Newton died. He served in this position until he became a bishop. He resigned from being a prebendary of Langford Manor in the church of Lincoln before 1574. Watson paid Robert Dudley, 1st Earl of Leicester 200 pounds to lobby for him not being made a bishop. The earl lobbied the Queen Elizabeth I saying "how otherwise it would be £200 out of his way". The Queen responded "Nay, then, Watson shall have it, he being more worthy thereof, who will give £200 to decline, than he who will give £2000 to attain it."

Queen Elizabeth I bestowed the position of bishop to Watson. He was consecrated as bishop on 15 September 1580.

Between 1580 and 1584 he was Bishop of Winchester.

Death
The Bishop died on 23 January 1583/84 in Winchester. He was buried on 17 February 1583/84 in the Nave of Winchester Cathedral, adjoining the 8th bay of the North aisle 1.

His will dated 22 October 1584 was proved citing Sir Francis Walsingham as Chief Overseer.

The burial stone of Bishop Watson is in Winchester Cathedral on the north side of the nave in the 5th, bay westward from the tower pillars. It is of a shelly limestone polished to resemble marble. The inscription in Latin is:

JOHANNES WATSON HVIVS ECCLESIAE WINTON
PRAEBENDARIVS DECANVS AC DEINDE ESPICOPVS
PRVDENTISSIMVS PATER, VIR OPTIMVS
PRAECIPVE ERGA INOPES MISERCORS
OBIT IN DOMINO JANUAR 23 ANNO AETATIS 63, EPISCOPATVS 4, 1583

John Watson, Prebendary Church In Winchester, Dean and then Bishop, a very wise father, A very good man, tender especially towards the Needy. He died in the Lord January 23rd. In the 63rd, year of his age, the 4th of his Bishopric, 1583

References

1520 births
1580s deaths
People from Evesham
Bishops of Winchester 
16th-century Church of England bishops
Deans of Winchester